This is a list of candidates for the 1898 New South Wales colonial election. The election was held on 27 July 1898.

The Protectionist Party contested this election under the name "National Federal Party", reflecting their focus on the issue of Federation.

Retiring members

National Federal
Michael Phillips MLA (Cowra)

Free Trade
George Greene MLA (Grenfell)
Leslie Hollis MLA (Goulburn)
Adrian Knox MLA (Woollahra)

Labor
Thomas Davis MLA (Sydney-Pyrmont)
George Smailes MLA (Granville)

Legislative Assembly
Sitting members are shown in bold text. Successful candidates are highlighted in the relevant colour. Where there is possible confusion, an asterisk (*) is also used.

See also
 Members of the New South Wales Legislative Assembly, 1898–1901

References
 

1898